Thurmond station is a train station in Thurmond, West Virginia, United States, that is served by Amtrak, the national railroad passenger system. The Cardinal, which runs three times each week between Chicago, Illinois and New York City, New York, passes by the station three times each week in both directions. The station is on CSX Transportation's New River Line and is located on the east bank of the New River.

Traffic
It is one of Amtrak's least-busy stations, it was the second least-busy for fiscal year 2006, after Greenfield Village, Michigan, which was less traveled because it had been discontinued from the Amtrak regular schedule in April 2006 (being open only to groups after that point). Of the 509 stations served by Amtrak in fiscal year 2012, Thurmond was again the second least-used station, just ahead of Sanderson, Texas.

History
The long, narrow two-story slate-roofed wooden structure, built in 1905 by the Chesapeake and Ohio Railway, also houses a railroad museum and a visitor center for the New River Gorge National River. The depot features a projecting bay that served as a signal tower. The interior originally possessed three waiting rooms: one for white men, one for white women, and one for African Americans. The building was renovated in 1995. It is a contributing structure in the Thurmond Historic District.

References

External links

Thurmond Amtrak Station & Museum (USA Rail Guide -- Train Web)
Thurmond Depot - The Museum (WVRailroads.com)
Thurmond Depot Visitor Center - U.S. National Park Service, New River Gorge National River, official site

Buildings and structures in Fayette County, West Virginia
Amtrak stations in West Virginia
Historic American Engineering Record in West Virginia
Railroad museums in West Virginia
Railway stations in the United States opened in 1905
New River Gorge National Park and Preserve
Museums in Fayette County, West Virginia
Stations along Chesapeake and Ohio Railway lines
Transportation in Fayette County, West Virginia
National Register of Historic Places in Fayette County, West Virginia